Kertosono Station (station code: KTS) is a type-B major railway station in Banaran, Kertosono, Nganjuk Regency, East Java, Indonesia, operated by Kereta Api Indonesia, located at 400 m south of Kertosono Market. The station is the most eastern and the largest railway station in Nganjuk Regency.

The station is the terminus of Solo Balapan–Kertosono, Kertosono–Wonokromo and Kertosono–Bangil railway lines.

Services

Passenger services

Executive class
 Bima, destination of  via  and 
 Gajayana, destination of  via  and 
 Brawijaya, destination of  via  and

Mixed class
 Brantas, destination of  via  and 

Economy class
 Majapahit, destination of  via  and 
 Matarmaja, destination of  via  and 

Local/regional train
 Kertosono Local Train, destination of

Freight services
  via --
  via --

References

External links 

 Kereta Api Indonesia - Indonesian railway company's official website

Nganjuk Regency
Railway stations in East Java